Vibra Energia (formerly Petrobras Distribuidora or BR) is the largest distributor and marketer of petroleum derivatives and biofuels (ethanol) of Brazil and Latin America. It was an subsidiary of Petrobras until 2021 but now it is a corporation. The company has more than 8,000 gas stations in Brazil. It was founded on November 12, 1971 and is headquartered in Rio de Janeiro.

Its largest competitors is Porto Alegre-based Ipiranga and Raízen (which operates filling stations branded as Shell).

References 

Energy companies established in 1971
Non-renewable resource companies established in 1971
Brazilian companies established in 1971